The Arion Press in the United States book publishing company founded in San Francisco in 1974. It has published 120 limited-edition books, most printed by letterpress, often illustrated with original prints by notable artists. Minneapolis Star Tribune described it as "the nation's leading publisher of fine-press books".

History 
The press, writes Michael Kimmelman of The New York Times, "carries on a grand legacy of San Francisco printers and bookmakers." The press was founded by Andrew Hoyem, continuing the tradition of the Grabhorn Press of Edwin and Robert Grabhorn. Hoyem had been partners for seven years with the younger Grabhorn brother, and after his death Hoyem started Arion Press, preserving the Grabhorn's historic collection of American metal type.

Since 2001, Arion Press has been a cultural tenant at the Presidio, where it shares an industrial building with its typecasting division, M & H Type—the oldest and largest hot metal type foundry in the U.S. for letterpress printers. The Arion Press gallery is open daily, and tours of the letterpress print shop, typefoundry, and book bindery are also available to visitors on a weekly schedule.

Arion Press has a nonprofit branch, the Grabhorn Institute, founded to help preserve and continue the use of one of the last integrated typefoundry, letterpress printing, and bookbinding facilities in the world. In recognition of this effort, in 2000 the Grabhorn Institute was designated by the National Trust for Historic Preservation as part of "the nation's irreplaceable historical and cultural legacy" under its Save America's Treasures program.

The press publishes three to four new books each year, in editions of 400 copies or less. "Its editions of such classics as Moby-Dick and contemporary works that pair poets and artists are considered to be among the most exquisitely printed books in the world," in the words of John King of the San Francisco Chronicle. The press's lectern edition of the Bible "will probably be the last lectern Bible to be produced using traditional methods [and] will no doubt be regarded as one of the finest examples of book-making." In part due to their scarcity, many of Arion's books are highly collectible.

Under Andrew  Hoyem,  who retired in 2018, the Press    focused on creating limited edition books of notable literature illustrated with original prints from prominent artists. The press's livre d'artiste series, launched in 1982, includes Robert Motherwell's etchings for James Joyce's Ulysses, Jasper Johns's etching for the poetry of Wallace Stevens, Richard Diebenkorn's etchings for the poetry of W. B. Yeats,  and Martin Puryear's woodblock prints for Jean Toomer's Cane. Other artists who have collaborated in Arion Press editions include Jim Dine, John Baldessari, Wayne Thiebaud, Alex Katz, Kiki Smith, R.B. Kitaj, Sol LeWitt, Mel Bochner, and Stephen Shore. The press has published such contemporary writers as Seamus Heaney, Allen Ginsberg, Tom Stoppard, Lawrence Ferlinghetti, David Mamet, Edward Albee and Arthur Miller. Other writers published by the press include Samuel Beckett, H.G. Wells, Graham Greene, Virginia Woolf, and Emily Dickinson.

Since Hoyem's retirement, the Press has continued its publication and public education activities. The staff continues the legacy of regularly producing books using the same traditional methods, and to collaborate with leading artists worldwide. The type foundry and book binding facility operate as they always have.

Arion Press books are in the collections of the Museum of Modern Art, the Huntington Library, the Fine Arts Museums of San Francisco, and the British Library, among others. Three of the Press's books were honored among the one hundred great books of the 20th Century in the 1994 Museum of Modern Art exhibition “One Hundred Years of Artists Books.”

Further reading
 Andrew Hoyem, 'Selling the goods - Arion Press', in Parenthesis; 20 (2011 Spring), p. 26-27

References

External links 
 M & H Type
 Grabhorn Institute
 PBS NewsHour video tour and interviews at Arion Press

Book publishing companies based in San Francisco
Publishing companies established in 1974
Private press movement